Puerto Fernández Alonso is a municipality in the province Obispo Santistevan in the department Santa Cruz in Bolivia. It is also known as Fernández Alonso.

History 
The municipality was created by Law 2320 on 28 January 2002. It comprised two cantons: 

 Fernández Alonso
 Chané Independencia 
Before 2002, these localities were part of the municipality of Montero.

References 

Municipalities of Santa Cruz Department (Bolivia)